Suraksan Tunnel is a tunnel on the Seoul Ring Expressway connecting Sanggye-dong, Nowon-gu, Seoul and Jangam-dong, Uijeongbu, Gyeonggi-do. It is made up of a pair of tunnels with four lanes going each way, and the length is 2,950 m in both directions. The width and height are the same as the other tunnels on the same route. Uijeongbu IC is to the north-west of the tunnel, and Sanggye-dong is to the southeast of the tunnel.

References

Seoul Ring Expressway